Muthu Vaduganatha Periyavudaya Thevar was the second king of the Sivagangai Estate which is also known "Lesser Maravar Kingdom". He ruled from 1750 to 1772.

Childhood 
Muthuvadukanatha Thevar son of Vijaya Raghunatha Sasivarna Periya Oodaiya Thevar was native of Sivagangai. His mother Akilandeshwari Nachiyar a was native of Ramnad Estate.

References

18th-century Indian monarchs
Tamil monarchs